Ibarra is a Basque-language surname meaning "valley" or "plain by the river". Notable people with the surname include:

Abelardo Colome Ibarra, Cuban vice president of the State Council
Adolfo Tapia Ibarra, Mexican professional wrestler better known as La Parka and L.A. Park
Angel Ibarra, guitarist for the band Aiden
Aníbal Ibarra, Argentine politician
Ascensión Esquivel Ibarra, former President of Costa Rica
Benny Ibarra, Mexican singer and actor
David Ibarra Muñoz, Mexican economist
Elio Ibarra, Argentine boxer
Eloísa Ibarra (born 1968), Uruguayan artist
Eustacio Jiménez Ibarra, Mexican professional wrestler better known as El Hijo de Cien Caras
Gabriel Mendoza Ibarra, Chilean footballer
Hugo Benjamín Ibarra, Argentine football (soccer) player
José María Velasco Ibarra, former President of Ecuador
Joaquín Ibarra (1725-1785), Spanish printer.
Juan Carlos Rodríguez Ibarra, Spanish politician
Manuel Ibarra, Chilean footballer
Miguel Ibarra (soccer, born 1990), American footballer
Pedro de Ibarra (governor of La Florida)
Ramón Ibarra Banda, Mexican professional wrestler better known as Super Parka
Ramón Ibarra Rivera, Mexican professional wrestler better known as Volador Jr.
Renato Ibarra, Ecuadorian professional footballer
Rosa Maria Ibarra, Spanish politician
Salomón Ibarra Mayorga, Nicaraguan poet, political thinker, and the lyricist who wrote the Nicaraguan National Anthem
Silvana Ibarra (born 1959), Ecuadorian singer, actress, and politician
Susie Ibarra, American percussionist
Vilma Ibarra, Argentine politician and sister of Aníbal

Basque-language surnames